"I Could Fall in Love with You" is a song recorded by English synthpop duo Erasure.  Written by band members Vince Clarke and Andy Bell, the track is the first single released from Erasure's thirteenth studio album Light at the End of the World.  Remixes are provided by Jeremy Wheatley and Lee Monteverde, and a James Aparicio mix is available exclusively in the UK iTunes Store.  The single contains a non-album B-side titled "I Like It".  "I Could Fall in Love with You" was released by Mute Records in the UK on 2 April 2007 and in North America the following day.  It was the first Erasure single to be commercially released on 7" vinyl since "Run to the Sun" 13 years previously.

Song information
Erasure member Vince Clarke described the origins of "I Could Fall in Love with You":

Music videos
There are two different music videos for this song.

Erasure's official website initially presented viewers with a "behind the scenes" look at the making of the music video for this song via RealMedia, Windows Media Player and QuickTime.  The footage showed Clarke and Bell as cashiers in a shop-like set-up.  The scenes were filmed with extras milling about in the foreground and the clips, filmed in front of a greenscreen, implied that special effects would be added in post production.

However, weeks later a call was put out for fans to submit pictures or video footage of themselves and loved ones in scenes depicting love or falling in love.  These scenes (also including Clarke and Bell) were then edited together into a montage with a "falling in love" theme.  This new version has sprung up on Erasure's YouTube site and also is viewable on Erasure's official website, dubbed the "alternate video".  The original version was made available months later on Erasure's website.

Chart positions
"I Could Fall in Love with You" entered the UK Singles Chart at number 21, becoming Erasure's thirty-third UK Top 40 single.  It peaked at number 69 on the German Singles Chart (Erasure's fifth single to peak at this position).  The song has entered the U.S. Hot Dance Club Play chart and peaked at number 7.

In the United States, the single was tracked incorrectly by Nielsen SoundScan during it first week of sales.  According to Billboard magazine, "Erasure's 'I Could Fall in Love with You' was initially identified as an EP, rather than a single.  It should have bowed last week (issue date 21 April) at number one on Hot Dance Singles Sales and number five on Hot Singles Sales." Once adjusted, the track appeared on those charts in the following chart week, at number three and number ten, respectively.

Chart performance

Track listing

UK CD single (CDMUTE366)
"I Could Fall in Love with You" (Jeremy Wheatley Radio Mix)
"I Could Fall in Love with You" (Monteverde Radio Edit)

UK maxi-CD single (LCDMUTE366)
"I Could Fall in Love with You" (Jeremy Wheatley Extended 12" Mix)
"I Like It"
"I Could Fall in Love With You" (Monteverde Vocal Extended Remix)

7" vinyl picture disc (MUTE366)
"I Could Fall in Love With You" (Jeremy Wheatley Radio Mix)
"I Like It"

North America maxi-CD single (MUT9354)
"I Could Fall in Love with You" (Jeremy Wheatley Radio Mix)
"I Could Fall in Love with You" (Jeremy Wheatley Extended 12" Mix)
"I Could Fall in Love with You" (Monteverde Radio Edit)
"I Could Fall in Love with You" (Monteverde Vocal Extended Mix)
"I Could Fall in Love with You" (Monteverde Dub 2)
"I Could Fall in Love with You" (Album Version)
"I Like It"

Charts

References

2007 singles
Erasure songs
Songs written by Vince Clarke
Songs written by Andy Bell (singer)
Song recordings produced by Gareth Jones
Mute Records singles
2007 songs